Miloš Cvetković (born 6 January 1990) is a Serbian footballer who plays as a right-back for Mladost Lučani.

Club career

Zemun
Born in Belgrade, Cvetković joined FK Zemun in 2005, where he ended youth career and later started playing professional football. Previously he was a member of Red Star Belgrade youth categories. Cvetković made his senior debut on 10 November 2007 at the age of 17, replacing Boško Čvorkov in the second half of match against RFK Novi Sad. He also played one more match, against OFK Mladenovac until the end of 2007–08 season. After the club relegated from the Serbian First League, Cvetković made 24 appearances for the 2008–09 Serbian League Belgrade season, contributing to the return of the club to a higher rank. He hade also 45 First League caps for Zemun between 2009 and 2011.

Rad / Palić
Miloš joined FK Rad in summer 2011, but he was loaned to Palić a shortly after, where he spent the first half of the 2011–12 season. He made 10 appearances in the Serbian League Vojvodina for Palić with average rating 7.05.

Hajduk Kula
At the beginning of 2012, Cvetković moved to Hajduk Kula. He joined the club as a reserve for Branko Pauljević, but also appeared as a left-back until the end of 2011–12 Serbian SuperLiga season. After his first SuperLiga season, Cvetković started new season as a back-up player, but later he became the first choice on the right-back position. He scored a goal in the match against Vojvodina, played on 20 October 2012. During the season, he also played as a left-back and defensive midfielder. He left the club as a free agent after the club dissolved.

Napredak Kruševac
In summer 2013, Cvetković signed a three-year contract with Napredak Kruševac. He played 27 league and 2 cup matches for the 2013–14 season. He also played with club in the first half of 2014–15 season, making 10 league and 1 cup appearance.

Red Star Belgrade
After Marko Petković's injury, Cvetković joined Red Star Belgrade by Nenad Lalatović's recommendation. He signed a two-year contract with club in December 2014. He made 14 appearances until the end of season and scored 1 goal, against Novi Pazar. After Miodrag Božović replaced Lalatović on the first team coach, Cvetković also started 2015–16 season as the first choice, but later moved on the bench and spent the mostly time as a reserve player for the rest of season, and also missed some period because of injury. For the new season, Božović started using Cvetković as the first choice on the right-back position. Despite a defeat, he was one of the better players in the defense line at home debacle match against Ludogorets Razgrad in 2nd leg of the 2016–17 UEFA Champions League third qualifying round. He also made assist on his first appearance in the 2016–17 Serbian SuperLiga season, against Voždovac. After the end of contract, Cvetković left the club.

Return to Napredak Kruševac
In February 2017, Cvetković returned to Napredak Kruševac.

Levski Sofia
On 16 June 2017, Cvetković signed with Bulgarian club Levski Sofia for 2+1 years.

Career statistics

Honours
Zemun
 Serbian League Belgrade: 2008–09
Red Star Belgrade
 Serbian SuperLiga: 2015–16

References

External links
 Miloš Cvetković stats at utakmica.rs
 
 
 
 Profile at Levskisofia.info

1990 births
Living people
Footballers from Belgrade
Serbian footballers
Serbia youth international footballers
Association football defenders
FK Zemun players
FK Rad players
FK Palić players
FK Hajduk Kula players
FK Napredak Kruševac players
Red Star Belgrade footballers
PFC Levski Sofia players
FK Mladost Lučani players
Serbian First League players
Serbian SuperLiga players
First Professional Football League (Bulgaria) players
Serbian expatriate footballers
Serbian expatriate sportspeople in Bulgaria
Expatriate footballers in Bulgaria